Indira Ampiot (born 19 September 2004) is a French model and beauty pageant titleholder who was crowned Miss France 2023. She had previously been crowned Miss Guadeloupe 2022 and Miss Basse-Terre 2022, and is the fourth woman from Guadeloupe to win Miss France.

Early life and education
Ampiot was born in Basse-Terre, in the overseas region of Guadeloupe, on 19 September 2004, to parents Didier Ampiot and Béatrice Téjou. She is of Indian origin through her maternal grandfather. Her father owns a communications and marketing agency, while her mother works in the social security sector. Téjou had previously been crowned Miss Basse-Terre 1998 and placed as the first runner-up at Miss Guadeloupe 1998. Ampiot is also the niece of footballer Frédéric Tejou. Ampiot has an elder brother, and her parents are divorced.

Ampiot graduated with her baccalauréat with honors in 2022, and had planned to pursue post-secondary education studying communication in Paris, with the goal of specializing in visual advertising, communication, and design, prior to becoming Miss France.

Pageantry

Miss Guadeloupe 2022
Ampiot began her pageantry career in 2022, after registering as a contestant for Miss Basse-Terre 2022. She ultimately went on to win the title during its final in January 2022. As Miss Basse-Terre, Ampiot was qualified to compete for Miss Guadeloupe 2022.

Ampiot later competed in Miss Guadeloupe 2022 in July 2022, and won the title. As Miss Guadeloupe, she received the right to represent the region at Miss France 2023.

Miss France 2023
Miss France 2023 was held on 17 December 2022 in Châteauroux. Prior to the start of the competition, Ampiot had already emerged as one of the frontrunners to win according to the French media. Ampiot competed in the finals, where she advanced to the top fifteen and later the top five. At the end of the pageant, Ampiot was declared the winner, being crowned by outgoing titleholder Diane Leyre of Île-de-France, becoming the fourth woman from Guadeloupe to win the title. During the competition, Ampiot received the maximum score from both the jury and the French public in both the top fifteen and the top five.

As Miss France, Ampiot was awarded a number of prizes and rewards, including a multitude gifts from sponsors, a year-long residence in a luxury Paris apartment, and an undisclosed monthly salary the equivalent of a senior executive in France.

References

External links

2004 births
French beauty pageant winners
French female models
French people of Guadeloupean descent
Guadeloupean people of Indian descent
Living people
Miss France winners
Miss Guadeloupe winners
People from Basse-Terre